Peter Marcus Kendall (born July 9, 1973) is a former American football guard.

High school and college 
Kendall played High school football at Archbishop Williams High School in Braintree, Massachusetts. He decided to stay in Massachusetts and play college football at Boston College where he was named all-Big East Conference as a junior and senior.

Professional career
He was drafted in the 1996 NFL Draft by the Seattle Seahawks with the 21st overall pick.  He would later play for the Arizona Cardinals and New York Jets.

In 2007, Kendall became embroiled in a contract dispute with the Jets' front office.  Kendall believed the team had reneged on a verbal agreement to raise his base salary for 2007 after he had agreed to restructure his contract the year before.  Kendall made his grievances public despite head coach Eric Mangini's instructions not to do so.  As a result, Mangini sent Kendall to the rookie dorms and demoted him to second string, further aggravating the situation.  On August 23, 2007 Kendall was traded to the Washington Redskins for a conditional draft pick (either a fifth round pick in 2008 or a fourth round pick in 2009, based on playing time). He became a free agent after the 2008 season.

Retirement
In an interview for the New York Jets Kendall stated between the ages of 36 and 37 he began a new career in financial services, accepting a job at a firm working in equity research sales.

Kendall was inducted into Boston College's Varsity Club Hall of Fame in 2010.

External links
Boston College Eagles Bio

References

1973 births
Living people
American football offensive guards
New York Jets players
Seattle Seahawks players
Arizona Cardinals players
Washington Redskins players
Boston College Eagles football players
Sportspeople from Quincy, Massachusetts
Players of American football from Massachusetts
Archbishop Williams High School alumni